Kenneth Cattanach MacDonald (July 11, 1872 – November 19, 1945) was a Canadian politician. He served in the Legislative Assembly of British Columbia from 1916 to 1928 and 1933 to his death in 1945, as a Liberal member for the constituency of North Okanagan.

References

British Columbia Liberal Party MLAs
1872 births
1945 deaths